Malapterurus teugelsi is a species of electric catfish endemic to Guinea where it occurs in the Kogon River. This species grows to a length of  SL.

The fish is named in honor of Belgian ichthyologist Guy Teugels (1954-2003), who as curator of fishes at the  Musée Royale de l’Afrique Centrale, collected the type specimen.

References

Fish described in 2002
Taxa named by Steven Mark Norris
Malapteruridae
Freshwater fish of Africa
Fish of West Africa
Endemic fauna of Guinea
Strongly electric fish